On March 30, 2010, three female employees launched a class action gender discrimination lawsuit against Bank of America and Merrill Lynch. The suit, which was filed by Judy Calibuso, a Miami financial adviser in Merrill Lynch, and Julie Moss and Dianne Goedtel, former financial advisers at Bank of America, inculpated the companies of providing the male counterparts of the suing employees with "bigger bonuses and better opportunities". Filed in the US District Court in Brooklyn, it further detailed that one of the female employees was verbally scolded when she confronted the officials. The suit asked for "back pay", "unspecified damages" and "class-action status". In a statement, Shirley Norton, a Bank of America representative denied the accusations and labeled them as "false".

On September 6, 2013, a settlement worth $39 million was reached between the parties. It sorted out statements claimed by around 4,800 current and former female financial advisers which claimed that "women were paid less than men, deprived of handling their fair share of lucrative accounts, and faced retaliation if they complained."

References

External links

Bank of America and Merrill Lynch Sex Discrimination Class Action Lawsuit (archived by Internet Archive Wayback Machine)
Calibuso v. Bank of America Corporation et al :: Justia Dockets & Filings (archived by Internet Archive Wayback Machine)
Women Employees Sue Bank of America and Merrill Lynch for Sex Discrimination (archived by Internet Archive Wayback Machine)
 Emerging Issues Law Community | LexisNexis (archived by Internet Archive Wayback Machine)

Class action lawsuits
Gender equality
Bank of America
United States lawsuits